The enzyme itaconyl-CoA hydratase catalyzes the chemical reaction

citramalyl-CoA  itaconyl-CoA + H2O

This enzyme belongs to the family of lyases, specifically the hydro-lyases, which cleave carbon-oxygen bonds.  The systematic name of this enzyme class is citramalyl-CoA hydro-lyase (itaconyl-CoA-forming). Other names in common use include itaconyl coenzyme A hydratase, and citramalyl-CoA hydro-lyase.  This enzyme participates in c5-branched dibasic acid metabolism.

References

 

EC 4.2.1
Enzymes of unknown structure